The North Caldwell Public Schools is a community public school district that serves students in pre-kindergarten through sixth grade from North Caldwell, in Essex County, New Jersey, United States.

As of the 2018–19 school year, the district, comprised of two schools, had an enrollment of 672 students and 62.7 classroom teachers (on an FTE basis), for a student–teacher ratio of 10.7:1.

The district is classified by the New Jersey Department of Education as being in District Factor Group "J", the-highest of eight groupings. District Factor Groups organize districts statewide to allow comparison by common socioeconomic characteristics of the local districts. From lowest socioeconomic status to highest, the categories are A, B, CD, DE, FG, GH, I and J.

North Caldwell is home to the West Essex Regional School District, which also serves public school students from Fairfield, Essex Fells and Roseland in seventh through twelfth grades. Schools in the district (with 2018–19 enrollment data from the National Center for Education Statistics) are 
West Essex Middle School with 564 students in grades 7-8 and 
West Essex High School with 1,123 students in grades 9-12.

Awards and recognition
Gould / Mountain School was one of nine schools in New Jersey honored in 2020 by the National Blue Ribbon Schools Program, which recognizes high student achievement.

Schools
Schools in the district (with 2018–19 enrollment data from the National Center for Education Statistics) are:
Grandview School 391 students in grades PreK-3
Michael Stefanelli, Principal
Gould School 276 students in grades 4-6
Chris Checchetto, Principal

Administration
Core members of the district's administration are:
Dr. Linda Freda, Superintendent
Michael Halik, School Business Administrator / Board Secretary

Board of education
The district's board of education, comprised of five members, sets policy and oversees the fiscal and educational operation of the district through its administration. As a Type II school district, the board's trustees are elected directly by voters to serve three-year terms of office on a staggered basis, with either one or two seats up for election each year held (since 2012) as part of the November general election. The board appoints a superintendent to oversee the day-to-day operation of the district.

References

External links 
North Caldwell Public Schools
 
School Data for the North Caldwell Public Schools, National Center for Education Statistics
West Essex Regional School District

New Jersey District Factor Group J
North Caldwell, New Jersey
School districts in Essex County, New Jersey